The Republic of Turkey Identity Card is compulsory for all Turkish citizens from birth. The Turkish police are allowed to ask any person to show ID, and refusing to comply may lead to a fine. It can be used as a travel document to enter Northern Cyprus, Bosnia and Herzegovina (planned),  Georgia (since 2011), Moldova (since 2019), Ukraine (since 2017, if arriving directly from Turkey), Azerbaijan (since 1 April 2021, if arriving directly from Turkey), and Serbia (since 2022) instead of a passport.

History
Identity cards, theoretically obligatory for all citizens, male and female, existed already in the late Ottoman Empire. They were known in Turkish as nüfus tezkeresi. To the Slavic subjects of the Ottoman state they were known colloquially as nofuz.

ID cards (1927-1991)

Turkey issued ID cards (Turkish: Nüfus Hüviyet Cüzdanı) with the 1927 census in Ottoman Arabic letters. With Turkey's change to Latin script, ID cards were changed to Latin in 1928. Surnames were added after 1934, with the Surname Law. Newer ID cards were issued in 1976, however old cards were still valid until 1991.

ID cards (issued 1976-2017, still valid)
Turkey issued ID cards (Turkish: Nüfus Cüzdanı) for all citizens beginning in 1976. The cards are 7x9 cm in size and have gender specific color (Orange/red for females, blue for males). Starting from 1999, cards were issued with a Turkish Identification Number. Cards have an embossed stamp for security.

Starting in 2017, this type of ID cards stopped being issued.

New identity cards (2017-current)
The Turkish Ministry of the Interior issued an EU-like identity card (Turkish: Kimlik Kartı) for all Turkish citizens. New identity cards are biometric like passports. Since 21 September 2020, they can be used as a driving licence. In the future they will be used as a bank card and bus ticket. Starting from 2 January 2017, these new ID cards were issued throughout Turkey. Unlike previous cards, which were valid for life, new cards are only valid for 10 years. They are in ID-1 (credit card) size, smaller than the previous cards. The cards are gender-neutral for all citizens. Cards are bilingual, both in Turkish and English. E-signatures can be installed into the card's chip. The cards have PIN codes for authorization.

During the application for new cards, fingerprints for all fingers and palm vein prints are collected and associated with the person. New cards require biometric photos (for ages 15 and up) and have an individual’s signature. The new cards also omit several pieces of information found on previous cards, such as; marital status, religion, blood type, place of issue, previous surname (for females), hometown (State, District, Village) and register numbers (volume, family and line numbers).

Machine Readable Zone 
There is a machine-readable zone on the back of the 2017 card. It consists of 3 rows each containing 30 characters. The format is compliant with ICAO Document 9303 Part 5.

Checksum calculation is the same algorithm used in Machine-readable passports. Multiply each digit by its weight. Weight of a digit depends on its position. The weight sequence is 7, 3, 1 and it repeats. The remainder of the sum of all values divided by 10 gives the check digit.

See also
Turkish passport
Visa policy of Turkey
Driving licence in Turkey
Turkish Identification Number
Turkish nationality law
Visa requirements for Turkish citizens
National identity cards in the European Economic Area

Notes

Turkey
Law enforcement in Turkey